The J. Frank Dobie House is a historic house in Austin, Texas built in the Colonial Revival style in 1925–26. The house was bought by J. Frank Dobie in 1926, and it contained the library and office where he did much of his writing. Until his death in 1964, Dobie used the house for informal entertaining with colleagues and students. It was acquired by the University of Texas at Austin in 1995, and currently houses the Michener Center for Writers.

References

Houses in Austin, Texas
National Register of Historic Places in Austin, Texas
University of Texas at Austin campus
Houses on the National Register of Historic Places in Texas
Recorded Texas Historic Landmarks
City of Austin Historic Landmarks
Houses completed in 1926
1926 establishments in Texas
University and college buildings completed in 1926